Jaime Brocal Remohí (June 11, 1936 – June 29, 2002; usually known in America as just Jaime Brocal) was a Spanish comic book artist.

Career 

Born in Valencia, southern Spain, Brocal began his comic career at the age of 20, working of various adventure comics including Leslie Charteris' The Saint and an adaption of Jules Verne's From the Earth to the  Moon. In 1960, at the age of 24, Brocal created the adventure series Katan and Ogan. Ten years later he would create the characters Kronan, Arcane and Ta-ar.  He also worked on various hard cover books such as Gandhi, Lawrence of Arabia, The Jewish People and The History of Islam. He would later produce illustrations for Planeta DeAgostini. He would also work for Japanese company Kodansha, drawing the series 'Kami no Ude', as well as stories with Leslie Charteris' 'The Saint' for the Swedish market and 'Tarzan' for the German publishers Ehapa. 

Due to his connections with Selecciones Ilustradas, Brocal joined American company Warren Publishing, as one of the first Spanish artists to work in their magazines, premiering in Eerie 34 in July 1971. Brocal drew 16 stories for Warren from 1971 through 1974. While at Warren he drew multiple recurring characters including 'Targos' and 'The Mummy', one of the first continuing series published in Eerie.  In 1991, together with Antonio Segura, he created the series El otro Necronomicón ("The Other Necronomicon") for the Spanish version of Creepy; it included seven short horror stories inspired by H. P. Lovecraft's world of creations.

Selected bibliography 

The Saint
From Earth to Moon
Katan
Ogan
Cronan
Arcane
Ta-ar
Gandhi
Lawrence of Arabia
The Jewish People
The History of Islam
Kami no Ude
Creepy (issues 43, 45, 49, 57)
Eerie (issues 34, 37–39, 47–50, 52–54)

Sources

External links
Jaime Brocal Remohi biography on Lambiek Comiclopedia

1936 births
2002 deaths
People from Valencia
Spanish comics artists
20th-century Spanish male artists